Frank Andre Guridy (born August 2, 1971) is an American historian, author and scholar. He was born, raised and resides in New York City, where he is the associate professor of history, specializing in Sport History, Urban History and the history of the African Diaspora in the Americas at the Columbia University.

Personal life

Guridy was born in New York City and grew up in Co-op City, Bronx. He has lived and worked in Austin, Paris, Los Angeles and New York City.  He is married to the poet Deborah Paredez.

Professional life

Guridy earned a BA from Syracuse University in 1993, a MA from the University of Illinois at Chicago and a Ph.D. from the University of Michigan. He has taught at University of Texas at Austin (2004–2016)

Bibliography
 Forging Diaspora: Afro-Cubans and African Americans in a World of Empire and Jim Crow (2010, University of North Carolina Press)
 Beyond El Barrio: Everyday Life in Latina/o America (2010, New York University Press, editor with Gina M. Pérez and Adrian Burgos)

References

External links
Frank Andre Guridy Columbia University Faculty Profile 
Frank Guridy on Afro-Cubans and African Americans in the Jim Crow Era

1971 births
Living people
21st-century American historians
American male non-fiction writers
Columbia University faculty
People from Co-op City, Bronx
Syracuse University alumni
University of Illinois Chicago alumni
University of Michigan alumni
University of Texas at Austin faculty
Historians from New York (state)